= Raul Mourão =

Brazilian artist (born 1967)

Raul Mourão (born 24 August 1967, Rio de Janeiro, Brazil) is an artist. His artwork includes the production of drawings, sculptures, videos, texts, installations and performances.
